Kang Soo-jin may refer to:
 Kang Sue-jin (born 1967), South Korean ballerina
 Kang Soo-jin (voice actor), South Korean voice actor
 Kang Soo-jin (voice actress), South Korean voice actress